Antonio Victor Pildáin y Zapiáin (17 January 1890 - 7 May 1973) was a Spanish prelate of the Roman Catholic church and Bishop of the Diocese of Canarias.

Biography
Pildáin was born on the 17 January 1890 in Guipúzcoa in the Basque region of Spain. He studied for the priesthood in Vitoria-Gasteiz and Rome and was ordained on 13 September 1913. On the 18 May 1936, Pope Pius XI named him bishop of the Diocese of Canarias - part of the Canary Islands including the islands of Gran Canaria, Lanzarote and Fuerteventura. He retired from his role in 1966 and died in Las Palmas on 7 May 1973.

See also
 Diocese of Canarias
 Diocese of Tenerife (the remaining Canary Islands)

References

Spanish Roman Catholic bishops
Bishops appointed by Pope Pius XI
1890 births
1973 deaths
People from Gipuzkoa
Basque Roman Catholic priests
Members of the Congress of Deputies of the Second Spanish Republic
Spanish politicians